Grace Cavalieri is an American poet, playwright, and radio host of the Library of Congress program The Poet and the Poem. In 2019, she was appointed the tenth Poet Laureate of Maryland.

Education
 MA - Creative Writing & Education: Goddard University, Plainfield, VT, 1975
 BS - Education: English and History, The College of New Jersey, Trenton, 1954
 Post-Graduate Studies, Graduate School of English, University of Maryland, College Park, MD, 1975–1976
 Graduate Studies in Education, Graduate School of Education, Rollins University, Orlando, FL, 1962–1963

Literary career 
In 1979 she founded The Bunny and the Crocodile Press/Forest Woods Media Productions, Inc., a publishing house and media production company.

Anna Nicole: Poems By Grace Cavalieri written by Grace Cavalieri was first published on March 7, 2008.

LIFE UPON THE WICKED STAGE: A Memoir written by Grace Cavalieri was first published on May 1, 2015.

In 2019, she was appointed the tenth Poet Laureate of Maryland.

Cavalieri has published 26 books and chapbooks of poetry, plus fiction. She has written many produced plays, plus texts for two produced operas. She co-founded the Washington Writers Publishing House with John McNally in 1976 and served on its editorial board from 1976 to 1982. In addition, in 1979 she founded The Bunny and the Crocodile Press/Forest Woods Media Productions, Inc., a publishing house and media production company.  Forest Woods Media Productions produces The Poet and the Poem for podcasts and public radio, now celebrating 44 years.  As of 2014, she still operates the small press, which is actively publishing. She has lectured and taught throughout the United States at several colleges and universities, and was, for 25 years, visiting poet at St. Mary's College of Maryland. She was resident writer at the Word Works annual retreat in Tuscany, 1996–2003. She was book editor of The Montserrat Review until 2011. She writes a monthly poetry feature entitled “Exemplars” for the Washington Independent Review of Books (2011–present).

Radio career

Cavalieri has had a long-term connection with public radio and public radio programming. Cavalieri and a core staff founded the non-commercial radio station WPFW-FM after being awarded a three-year National Endowment for the Arts (NEA) Radio Development Grant in 1976. Cavalieri worked for the station as Director of Arts Programming from 1976 to 1978, and as a radio producer from 1976 to 1985. She has produced more than 100 programs in radio drama, and poetry and arts criticism, including Poetry from the City, Expressions, and Writer's Workshop on the Air.

Cavalieri worked as a radio broadcaster at WPFW-FM from 1977 to 1997 and is best known in the Washington literary community for her program The Poet and the Poem. The show aired weekly from 1977 to 1997, and was distributed nationally through the Pacifica Radio station network, which includes KPFA-FM/KPFB-FM Berkeley, California, KPFK-FM North Hollywood, California, KPFT-FM Houston, Texas, and WBAI-FM New York City, New York. Cavalieri stopped airing The Poet and the Poem through WPFW-FM in 1997 and now presents this series to public radio from the Library of Congress via NPR satellite. Approximately ten episodes from the Library of Congress series are produced each season, and podcasts are made available through the Library of Congress. Typically, The Poet and the Poem features poets who live in the Washington, D.C. area and have become a part of the Washington literary community. Cavalieri has been committed to presenting various American cultural traditions on the program and is particularly interested in the black literary community. The recordings of her programs include a significant collection of African-American poets.

In addition, she was an Associate Director of Programming at the Public Broadcasting System (PBS) for five years and subsequently served as program officer of the National Endowment for the Humanities media program from 1982 to 1988.

Personal life
Cavalieri lives in Annapolis, Maryland. She has four grown daughters: Cynthia, Colleen, Shelley and Angela; and four grandchildren: Rachel, Elizabeth, Sean and Joseph, and great grandchild Dylan. Her husband, sculptor Kenneth Flynn, died on January 15, 2013.

Bibliography

Poetry
 2022 - Why I Cannot Take A Lover, 2nd Edition (Washington Writer's Publishing House)
 2021 - Grace Art: Poetry and Paintings (Poet's Choice Publishing)
 2021 - The Secret Letters of Madame de Stael (Goss Publication)
 2020 - What The Psychic Said (Goss Publication)
 2019 - Showboat (Goss Publication)
 2017 - Other Voices, Other Lives (Alan Squire Publishing)
 2016 - With (Somondoco Press)
 2015 - Life Upon The Wicked Stage(New Academia/Scarith)
 2014 - The Mandate of Heaven (Bordighera Press)
 2014 - The Man Who Got Away (New Academia/Scarith)
 2013 - Cosa farei per Amore: Poesie dalla voce di Mary Wollstonecraft
 2012 - Gotta Go Now (Goss 183: Casa Medendez)
 2011 - Millie's Sunshine Tiki Villas: A Novella in Verse (Goss 183: Casa Menendez)
 2010 - Sounds Like Something I Would Say (Goss 183: Casa Menendez)
 2010 - Navy Wife (Goss 183: Casa Menendez)
 2008 - Anna Nicole: Poems (Goss 183: Casa Menendez)
 2006 - Water On The Sun: Acqua Sul Sole (translated by Maria Enrico) - (Bordighera, Inc.)
 2004 - What I Would Do For Love (Jacaranda Press)
 2002 - Greatest Hits, 1975-2000 (Pudding House Press)
 2001 - Cuffed Frays and Other Works (Argonne Press)
 1999 - Sit Down, Says Love (Argonne Hotel Press)
 1998 - Heart on a Leash (Red Dragon Press)
 1998 - Pinecrest Rest Haven (Word Works)
 1995 - Migrations : Poems with Mary Ellen Long (Book Distribution, In Support)
 1990 - Trenton (Belle Mead Press)
 1986 - Bliss (Hillmunn Roberts Publishing)
 1979 - Swan Research (Word Works)
 1976 - Body Fluids (Bunny and the Crocodile Press)
 1975 - Why I Cannot Take a Lover - (Washington Writers Publishing House)

Edited volumes
 2021 – The Road Beneath Our Feet by Dan Murano with ekphrastic poems by poets 
 2021 – The Song In The Room (Forest Woods Media)
 2019 – Poet Trees, photographs by Dan Murano with ekphrastic poems by poets
 2010 – The Poet's Cookbook: Recipes from Germany with poems from 33 American Poets (Translator, Sabine Pascarelli) (Goethe-Institut & Forest Woods Media)
 2009 – The Poet’s Cookbook: Recipes from Tuscany with poems from 28 American poets (translator, Sabine Pascarelli) (Bordighera Press)
 1997 – Cycles of the Moon Vine by Jean Emerson (Forest Woods Media Productions)
 1992 – WPFW 89.5FM Poetry Anthology: The Poet and the Poem (Bunny and the Crocodile Press)

Produced plays and staged play readings 1966–2019

 Quilting The Sun, Dream-Up Festival, Theater for the New York City, NYC 2019
 Calico and Lennie, Theater for the New York City, NYC 2017
 Anna Nicole: Blonde Glory
Production
Dream Up Festival NYC, August 2011
Reading, Muhlenberg Library, NYC March 2009
Reading, Bethesda MD Writers’ Center, May 2009
Reading full length NYC, March 2011
Scene4: International Magazine of the Arts 2010
 Lena's Quilt
Production:
Harlem Renaissance NYC (museums and libraries) February and March 2010 & 2011
 Quilting the Sun
Productions:
Theater for the New York City, NYC 2019
Palmetto Theater, ARTWORKS, Beaufort SC 2011
World Premiere Centre Stage, Greenville SC 2007
 Jennie & The JuJu Man
Production:
Typewriter Dreams Common Basis Theatre 2003
CUNY Grad Center, NYC Theater Festival 2004
 Hyena in Petticoats
Reading, Takoma Park Theater, Maryland March 2010
Staged presentation, NYC Public Library March 2006
Staged  Production, Ft. Lewis College CO June 2007
Publication Scene4:International Magazine of the Arts
 Passage  Grace's text: MAP
Art, Poetry, Dance Installation, Artposium, Durango CO September 2007 (note: the Corner Theater in Baltimore was started by Ellen Stewart of NYC's Café La Mama)
 The Late and Blooming Early Branch
Productions:
Polemic Theater, Washington DC 1968
Corner Theater, Baltimore MD 1969, 1970
Milford MA High School 1970
William and Mary College, Williamsburg VA 1970
Published:
One Act Publishing Company 1968
 Birds That Call Before The Rain
Productions:
Corner Theater, Baltimore MD 1968
Theater Lobby, Washington DC 1969
William and Mary College, VA 1970
 The Death Of A Child By Beating Or Not
Production:
Corner Theater, Baltimore MD 1968 & 1970
 What Shall We Do Yesterday
Productions:
Corner Theater, Baltimore MD 1968, 1970
Polemic Theater, Washington DC 1969
Towson State College 1970
Trinity University, San Antonio TX 1971
Notre Dame College, Baltimore MD 1970
La Pensee, Seattle WA, 1975-76
Produced for radio, Pacifica network 1977
Published
 Heads
Productions:
Notre Dame College, Baltimore MD 1970
The Corner Theater, 1970
Theater Prospect, San Francisco CA 1973
 The Planned Escape Of Bonita And Bright
Production:
William and Mary College, VA 1970
 Old Favorites
Productions:
The Corner Theater 1971
Washington DC's Contemporary Arts Theater 1999
 Eleventh Hour Song
The Corner Theater 1971
 Smarts
Antioch College, Baltimore MD 1971
 Backyard Fun
Upstairs Theater, Columbia MD
Antioch College, Columbia MD  (there are 3 Antioch College Centers)
 Cuffed Frays
Produced for radio: The Pacifica Network, 1962
For Stage: The Charleston Stage Company, Charleston WV 20001
Published in verse form, Argonne House Press, c. 2001
 Best Of Friends (several other places, cities and theaters)
Productions:
College of Notre Dame 1975
Theater Project 1976
Corner Theater 1975
La Pensee Theater, Seattle WA 1975- 76
Moming Theater (Reading) Chicago IL 1977
Production:
(Renamed) The Sticker Tree
Quaigh Theater NYC 1986
Publication:
Scene4:International Magazine of the Arts
 Stripping
Reading, The John Houseman Theater NYC 1993
Children's play: In The Land Of Elbows
Webster Grove Children's Theater, MO 1970
 Hush, No One Is Listening
Festival, Religion and Art, Sacramento CA, 1970
Published:
Dramatics Magazine c. 1972
Kauri, 1968
 We Regret to Inform You
Productions:
Theater Lobby, Washington DC, 1970
Univ of Missouri 1969
Radio Production: Pacifica Network, 1977
Published:
Per/Se, The Smith Magazine 1970
 Keeper of the Station
Production:
University of Washington, Seattle WA, 1966
Published:
Contemporary Drama Service 1970
Kauri 1968
 Pinecrest Rest Haven
Production:
The Common Basis Theatre, NYC 2001
Staged Readings:
Clemente del Sole, NYC 1998  
The Ice House, Berkeley Springs, WV 1998
The Writer's Center of Washington DC, Bethesda MD 1998
Audio Production: Tape
Published:
Scene4: International Magazine of the Arts
PEMBROKE Magazine, Univ of NC at Pembroke
 Harvest Kitchen
Produced for Radio Pacifica Network 1976
 Getting Ready
Production:
The WPA Theater, NYC 1972
 String of Pearls (music by Vivian Adelberg Rudow)
MONO OPERA, lyrics and text
Production:
The Walters Museum and Gallery, Baltimore MD 1986
Text and Libretto for Opera
 Migrations (music by Vivian Adelberg Rudow)
Production:
Franz Bader Gallery, Washington DC 1988
(Partial reading) Loyola College, Baltimore MD 2000
Radio production via NPR satellite 1988, 1989
Pacifica Network, 1988 & 1990
Published:
Vision Library Publications, c1995
 Song Cycle
Lyrics for Purple Ice with composer Vivian Adelberg Rudow
Several stages in Baltimore MD
 Journey of Waters song, lyrics
Annapolis Chorale and Chamber Music Orchestra w. Composer Rudow
St. Anne's Church, Annapolis MD 2006
Har Sinai Synagogue, Baltimore MD 2006
Production: 
CDs of Cavalieri/Rudow collaboration (2005-2011)

Fiction

True Stories : Fiction by Uncommon Women (Red Dragon Press, 1997).

Literary awards

Cavalieri has received numerous literary awards.  Highlights include:

 2019 The Annie Award
 2018 Selected to serve as the next Poet Laureate for the State of Maryland
2015 THE MANDATE OF HEAVEN Bordighera Press Paterson Award for Literary Excellence
 2015 The Inaugural Lifetime Achievement Award from Washington Independent Review of Books
 2013 Co-winner, 2013 Allen Ginsberg Award for Poetry
 2013 George Garrett Award for Community Service to Literature "for her dedication to helping the next generation of writers find their way as artists and literary professionals".
 The Paterson Literary Review Lifetime Achievement Award for Service to Poetry
 The Columbia Award
 The Pen-Syndicated Fiction Award
 The Allen Ginsberg Poetry Award
 Bordighera Poetry Award for Water on the Sun
 Paterson Poetry Prize for What I Would Do for Love: Poems in the Voice of Mary Wollstonecraft
 The Witter Bynner Foundation for Poetry
 The National Endowment for the Arts
 The Corporation for Public Broadcasting Silver Medal
 The National Commission on Working Women
 The American Association of University Women
 The Paterson Award for Literary Excellence for Anna Nicole: Poems
 The Dragonfly Press Award for Outstanding Literary Achievement
 The DC Poet Laureate Special Award in Poetry
 The DC Public Humanities Award
 The West Virginia Women in Arts Award

She has enjoyed several state arts and humanities council awards and fellowships. She received the inaugural Columbia Award from the Folger Shakespeare Library Poetry Committee for "significant contribution to poetry."

References

External links 

Grace Cavalieri Poetry in Motion
Guide to the Grace Cavalieri Papers, 1945-2014, Special Collections Research Center, Estelle and Melvin Gelman Library, The George Washington University

1932 births
20th-century American dramatists and playwrights
20th-century American poets
20th-century American women writers
21st-century American dramatists and playwrights
21st-century American poets
21st-century American women writers
American opera librettists
American radio personalities
American women dramatists and playwrights
American women poets
Living people
Women opera librettists
Writers from Annapolis, Maryland
Writers from Washington, D.C.